Bright Ojamohare Sodje (born 21 April 1966) is a retired dual-code rugby player, who played for rugby league clubs; the Wakefield Trinity (Wildcats), Hull Kingston Rovers, and the Sheffield Eagles in England as well as rugby union for Wakefield RFC.

Sodje's brothers, Sam, Efe, Akpo, Steve, and his nephew, Onome, have all played professional football in England.

Bright was a winger with a reputation for scoring tries, and noted for his aeroplane style celebration.

Financial Crisis at Wakefield Trinity Wildcats
In 2000, at the height of a financial crisis at Wakefield Trinity Wildcats, the contracts of all players aged over 24 were terminated during September 2000. The players affected were; Andy Fisher, Bobbie Goulding, Warren Jowitt, Tony Kemp (player-coach), Steve McNamara, Francis Maloney, Martin Masella, Steve Prescott, Bright Sodje, Francis Stephenson and Glen Tomlinson.

Personal life
In September 2017, Bright was sentenced to 21 months in prison for fraud, having – with his brothers Efe and Stephen – siphoned off money from a charity, the Sodje Sports Foundation.

His son, Tai, is a professional footballer, and currently plays for the academy team of Manchester City.

References

External links
 Statistics at rugbyleagueproject.org

1966 births
Living people
Alumni of Sheffield Hallam University
Black British sportspeople
British people convicted of fraud
Citizens of Nigeria through descent
English criminals
English people of Nigerian descent
English rugby league players
English rugby union players
Hull Kingston Rovers players
Prisoners and detainees of England and Wales
Rugby league wingers
Sheffield Eagles players
Wakefield RFC players
Wakefield Trinity players